This is a list of amphibians found in Nicaragua. 71 amphibian species have been registered in Nicaragua, grouped in 2 orders: Salamanders (Caudata) and Frogs and Toads (Anura). This list is derived from the database listing of AmphibiaWeb.

Salamanders (Caudata)

Plethodontidae 
Order: Caudata. 
Family: Plethodontidae
Bolitoglossa doefleini 
Bolitoglossa insularis 
Bolitoglossa mombachoensis (VU)
Bolitoglossa striatula (LC)
Nototriton saslaya (VU)
Oedipina collaris (DD)
Oedipina cyclocauda (LC)
Oedipina koehleri 
Oedipina nica 
Oedipina pseudouniformis (EN)

Toads and frogs (Anura)

Bufonidae 
Order: Anura. 
Family: Bufonidae
Incilius coccifer (LC)
Incilius coniferus (LC)
Incilius luetkenii (LC)
Rhaebo haematiticus (LC)
Rhinella marina (LC)

Centrolenidae 
Order: Anura. 
Family: Centrolenidae
Cochranella granulosa (LC)
Espadarana prosoblepon (LC)
Hyalinobatrachium fleischmanni (LC)
Sachatamia ilex (LC)
Teratohyla pulverata (LC)
Teratohyla spinosa (LC)

Craugastoridae 
Order: Anura. 
Family: Craugastoridae
Craugastor bransfordii (LC)
Craugastor chingopetaca (DD)
Craugastor fitzingeri (LC)
Craugastor laevissimus (EN)
Craugastor lauraster (EN)
Craugastor megacephalus (LC)
Craugastor mimus (LC)
Craugastor noblei (LC)
Craugastor polyptychus (LC)
Craugastor ranoides (CR)
Craugastor talamancae (LC)

Dendrobatidae 
Order: Anura. 
Family: Dendrobatidae
Dendrobates auratus (LC)
Oophaga pumilio (LC)

Dermophiidae 
Order: Anura. 
Family: Dermophiidae
Dermophis mexicanus (VU)
Gymnopis multiplicata (LC)

Eleutherodactylidae 
Order: Anura. 
Family: Eleutherodactylidae
Diasporus diastema (LC)

Hylidae 
Order: Anura. 
Family: Hylidae
Agalychnis callidryas (LC)
Agalychnis saltator (LC)
Cruziohyla calcarifer (LC)
Dendropsophus ebraccatus (LC)
Dendropsophus microcephalus (LC)
Dendropsophus phlebodes (LC)
Ecnomiohyla miliaria (VU)
Hypsiboas rufitelus (LC)
Ptychohyla hypomykter (CR)
Ptychohyla spinipollex (EN)
Scinax boulengeri (LC)
Scinax elaeochroa (LC)
Scinax staufferi (LC)
Smilisca baudinii (LC)
Smilisca phaeota (LC)
Smilisca puma (LC)
Smilisca sordida (LC)
Tlalocohyla loquax (LC)
Trachycephalus venulosus (LC)

Leptodactylidae 
Order: Anura. 
Family: Leptodactylidae
Engystomops pustulosus (LC)
Leptodactylus fragilis (LC)
Leptodactylus melanonotus (LC)
Leptodactylus savagei (LC)

Microhylidae 
Order: Anura. 
Family: Microhylidae
Gastrophryne pictiventris (LC)
Hypopachus variolosus (LC)

Ranidae 
Order: Anura. 
Family: Ranidae
Rana berlandieri (LC)
Rana forreri (LC)
Rana maculata (LC)
Rana miadis (VU)
Rana taylori (LC)
Rana vaillanti (LC)
Rana warszewitschii (LC)

Rhinophrynidae 
Order: Anura. 
Family: Rhinophrynidae
Rhinophrynus dorsalis (LC)

Strabomantidae 
Order: Anura. 
Family: Strabomantidae
Pristimantis cerasinus (LC)
Pristimantis ridens (LC)

See also 

 Fauna of Nicaragua

Notes

References 

 
Amphibians
Nicaragua
Nicaragua